The Owens River course includes headwaters points near the Upper San Joaquin Watershed, reservoirs and diversion points (e.g., for the Los Angeles Aqueduct), and the river's mouth at Owens Lake.

References

Landforms of Inyo County, California
Landforms of Mono County, California
Los Angeles Aqueduct